Local elections were held in Marikina on May 9, 2022, as part of the Philippine general election. Held concurrently with the national elections, the electorate voted to elect a mayor, a vice mayor, sixteen city council members, and two district representatives to congress. Those elected took their respective offices on June 30, 2022, for a three-year-long term. 

Incumbents Marcelino Teodoro and Marion Andres were reelected to the mayoralty and the vice mayoralty respectively, both winning with wide margins against their opponents. The United Nationalist Alliance under Team MarCy won 14 seats in the city council, while the primary opposition coalition, Team BF failed to win any seats. The only other party to win a seat in the city council was the Liberal Party, which won two seats.

Marjorie Ann Teodoro and Stella Quimbo were elected as the representatives for the first and second districts respectively, with the former being elected for her first term and the latter being reelected for her second. Teodoro's election and Quimbo's reelection marked the first time both Marikina seats were held by women.

Background 
In the 2019 elections, Marcelino Teodoro was reelected to a second term as mayor without any opposition. His running mate, Marion Andres, was elected to his first term as vice mayor under Teodoro after defeating two other candidates.

During the passage of Typhoon Ulysses in November 2020, the Marikina River surpassed the water levels brought by Tropical Storm Ondoy in 2009, resulting in flooding throughout the city. As a result of the floods and losses, Teodoro declared a state of calamity in the city.

Later that year, Teodoro submitted a complaint to the Department of Environment and Natural Resources against BFCT, a construction firm owned by the family of Bayani Fernando. Teodoro claimed that the flooding caused by the passage of Typhoon Ulysses was a result of the construction firm's land reclamation project along the Marikina river. Fernando denied Teodoro's claims, commenting that the flooding was the result of the narrowing of the river and the construction of the Manalo Bridge. The department would ultimately approve Teodoro's request to remove the reclaimed land, culminating in his ouster from the Nationalist People's Coalition. Teodoro and his allies would later migrate to the United Nationalist Alliance.

Campaign 
The campaign period for local elections started on March 25, 2022. During the campaign period, the candidates and coalitions held motorcades, rallies and house-to-house campaigns.

Platforms 
Marcelino Teodoro's platform focused on the city's recovery from the COVD-19 pandemic. It sought to improve the public healthcare infrastructure, conduct a safe return to in-person classes, and to continue the welfare programs enacted by his administration. Teodoro also aimed to unite the city amid the pandemic.

Bayani Fernando, Teodoro's opponent promised to solve the city's flooding problems, improve the city's infrastructure, and continue the policies he had enacted in his previous tenures as mayor and as MMDA chairman. In an interview with OneNewsPH, Fernando expressed regret in endorsing Teodoro in earlier races, calling it a mistake.

Miting de avance 
The "miting de avance" is the final political rally of the candidates, usually held on the last day of the campaign period or two days before election day. 

On May 5, Team Performance held a grand rally in Parang. The next day, Team Del held their miting de avance at Concepcion Uno, among other locations. On the final day of the campaign period, Team MarCy held their miting de avance at Santo Nino along the Marikina River.

Coalitions 
As the mayor, vice mayor and the members of the city council are elected on the same ballot, mayoral candidates may present or endorse a slate of city council candidates. These slates usually run with their respective mayoral and vice mayoral candidates along with the other members of their slate. A group of candidates independent of any mayoral or vice mayoral candidate may also form a slate consisting of themselves.

Administration coalition

Primary opposition coalition

Other coalitions

Independents not in coalitions

Non-independents not in coalitions

Opinion polling 
Opinion polling for Marikina elections are seldom published by established pollsters such as Social Weather Stations (SWS), Pulse Asia, and OCTA Research. Despite this, other pollsters such as Publicus Asia and RP-Mission and Development Foundation  do conduct surveys for local races.

For mayor

For vice mayor

For representative

First District

Second District

Mayoral election 
The incumbent mayor was Marcelino Teodoro, who was reelected in 2019 without any opposition. Teodoro ran for reelection for a third term as mayor.

Teodoro's sole opponent was incumbent representative Bayani Fernando, who previously held the seat from 1992 to 2001. Fernando and Teodoro were generally viewed as allies, with Fernando's endorsement of Teodoro in the 2016 mayoral race being noted as a factor of the latter's election to the mayoralty. The alliance between the two soured following the onslaught of Typhoon Ulysses, with media outlets such as The Manila Times describing the race as a "bitter rivalry". Both candidates filed their certificates of candidacy on October 5, 2021.

Candidates 
 Bayani Fernando (NPC), incumbent representative for the 1st district (2016–2022), former mayor of Marikina (1992–2001), and former MMDA chairman (2002–2009)
 Marcelino Teodoro (UNA), incumbent mayor of Marikina (2016–present), and former representative for the 1st district (2007–2016)

Results 

Teodoro won by a landslide, winning in all 16 barangays. Fernando failed to carry his home barangay of Industrial Valley.

Per Barangay

Vice mayoral election 
The incumbent vice mayor was Marion Andres, who was elected in 2019 with 61.98% of the vote. Andres sought a second (fifth nonconsecutive) term as vice mayor.  

Andres previously served three terms as vice mayor under Marides Fernando, the wife of mayoral candidate Bayani Fernando; he previously ran for the mayoralty in 2010, where he lost to Del De Guzman. Team BF, the main opposition coalition slated Tumana Barangay Captain Ziffred Ancheta to run against Andres. Ancheta previously faced charges for the dissemination of false information during the early stages of the COVID-19 pandemic.

Candidates 
 Francis Joseph Acop (PPM)
 Ziffred Ancheta (PFP), Barangay captain of Tumana (2010–present)
 Marion Andres (UNA), incumbent vice mayor of Marikina (2001–2010; 2019–present), and candidate for mayor in 2010
 Sherwin Dela Cruz (Aksyon)

Results 

Like his running mate, Andres was reelected in a landslide victory, winning in all 16 barangays. Ancheta failed to carry her home barangay of Tumana, where she is barangay captain; although the barangay did give her best electoral performance.

Per barangay

House of Representatives elections 

Coinciding with the local elections, two representatives from the city's two congressional districts were elected to represent their respective districts in the House of Representatives. In the 2019 elections, Bayani Fernando and Stella Quimbo were elected to represent the first and second districts respectively. Both representatives are in the minority bloc in the 18th Congress.
{| class="wikitable" style="font-size: 95%;"
|+ colspan="8" | Summary of the 2022 Philippine House of Representatives Elections in Marikina
|-
! colspan="2" style="width: 15em" |Party
!Coalitions
! style="width: 5em" |Candidates
! style="width: 5em" |Seats Before
! style="width: 5em" |Seats Won
!Seat Change
! style="width: 5em" |Votes
! style="width: 5em" |Percentage
|-
| style="background:#f0e68c" |
|Liberal Party
|Team Performance
|1
|1
|1
|
|103,108
|44.97%
|-
| style="background:#FE4D00" |
|United Nationalist Alliance
|Team MarCy
|1
|0
|1
| 1
|68,572
|29.91%
|-
| style="background:#4AA02C" |
|Nationalist People's Coalition
|Team BF
|1
|1
|0
| 1
|24,584
|10.72%
|-
| style="background:#9683EC" |
|Aksyon Demokratiko
|Team Del
|1
|0
|0
|
|20,674
|9.02%
|-
| style="background:#FE0000" |
|Kilusang Bagong Lipunan
|–
|1
|0
|0
|
|894
|0.39%
|-
! colspan="7" style="text-align:right;" |Valid Votes
| style="background:#f6f6f6" | 217,832
| style="background:#f6f6f6" | 95.01%
|-
! colspan="7" style="text-align:right;" | Invalid or Blank Votes
| style="background:#f6f6f6" |11,435
| style="background:#f6f6f6" |4.99%
|- style="background:#eee;"
! colspan="7" style="text-align:right;" |Total
| style="background:#f6f6f6"text-align:left;" |229,267
| style="background:#f6f6f6"text-align:left;" |100.00%
|-
| colspan="9" |Source:
|}

First District

The first district covers the barangays of Barangka, Calumpang, Industrial Valley Complex, Jesus de la Peña, Malanday, San Roque, Santa Elena, Santo Niño and Tañong. The incumbent representative was Bayani Fernando, who was reelected in 2019 with 80.46% of the vote. Fernando is eligible for reelection but has opted to run for mayor, rather than a third term as a representative.  

Fernando's party, the Nationalist People's Coalition nominated former vice mayor Jose Fabian Cadiz in his place. Cadiz had previously ran for the seat in 2019 but eventually withdrew. On the other hand, the United Nationalist Alliance under Team MarCy nominated the first lady of Marikina, Marjorie Ann Teodoro to challenge Cadiz for the seat. Three months before the election, Cadiz died from cardiac arrest. As a result, his party named his nephew, Jose Miguel Cadiz, as their substitute candidate.

 Candidates 

 Jose Miguel "Migoy" Cadiz (NPC), nephew of Jose Fabian Cadiz.
 Marjorie Ann "Maan" Teodoro (UNA), teacher, and wife of Marcelino Teodoro.

 Former Candidate 

 Jose Fabian Cadiz (NPC), former vice mayor of Marikina (2010–2019) (died February 20'')

Results 
Like her husband in the mayoral race, Teodoro defeated Cadiz in a wide margin, winning in all nine barangays within the district. Her win, along with Quimbo's in the neighboring district, marked the first time both congressional seats in Marikina were held by women.

Per barangay

Second District 

The second district covers the barangays of Concepcion Uno, Concepcion Dos, Fortune, Marikina Heights, Parang, Nangka and Tumana. The incumbent representative was Stella Quimbo, who was elected in 2019 with 83.74% of the vote. Quimbo sought reelection for a second term as representative. 

Quimbo faced a challenge from former mayor Del de Guzman, who had previously held this seat from 2007 to 2010.

Candidates 

 Mauro Arce (KBL), candidate for representative in 2019
 Del de Guzman (Aksyon), former mayor of Marikina (2010–2016), former representative for the at-large district, later 2nd district (2001–2010)
 Stella Quimbo (Liberal), incumbent representative (2019–present)

Results 
Quimbo handily defeated de Guzman in his bid to re-enter the House of Representatives, winning in all seven barangays within the district.

Per barangay

City Council election  

The city council is composed of 18 members, 16 of which are elected to serve three-year terms. The sixteen seats are equally divided between the city's councilor districts, which are derived from the congressional districts. Each district has its own set of candidates, with the eight candidates with the most votes per district being elected to the council. 

Team MarCy successfully retained their majority in the City Council, with every candidate under the coalition being elected to the council. The Liberal Party under Team Performance was the only other party to win any seats in the election. Meanwhile, the primary opposition coalition, Team BF failed to win any seats.  

Of the twelve councilors running for reelection, all but one retained their seat in the council; Joel Relleve from the 2nd district was defeated in his reelection bid. Four neophytes were elected to the council, them being Rommel Acuña from the 1st district, Jojo Banzon from the 1st district, Marife Dayao from the 2nd district, and Larry Punzalan from the 2nd district. Former councilors Eva Aguirre-Paz, Vic Tabuli Sambinano and Xyza Diazen-Santos were defeated in their bids to re-enter the council.

Results per candidate

1st District 

|-bgcolor=black
|colspan=5|

| colspan="5" |Source:

2nd district

|-bgcolor=black
|colspan=5|

| colspan="5" |Source:

Results per coalition

Overall

1st district

2nd district

Notes

References 

2022 Philippine local elections
Elections in Marikina
May 2022 events in the Philippines
2022 elections in Metro Manila